KMAC may refer to:

 KMAC (FM), a defunct radio station (90.3 FM) formerly licensed to serve Antlers, Oklahoma, United States
 KMAC-LP, a low-power radio station (92.5 FM) licensed to serve Muscatine, Iowa, United States
 KBOD, a radio station (99.7 FM) licensed to serve Gainesville, Missouri, United States, which held the call sign KMAC from 1988 to 2012
 KSLR, a radio station (630 AM) licensed to serve San Antonio, Texas, United States, which held the call sign KMAC from 1926 to 1983
 Macon Downtown Airport (ICAO code KMAC)